Wild Animal Park may refer to:

 San Diego Zoo Safari Park, formerly known as the San Diego Wild Animal Park, near Escondido, California
 Whipsnade Wild Animal Park, in Bedfordshire, England
 South Lakes Safari Zoo (Formerly South Lakes Wild Animal Park), near Barrow-in-Furness, Cumbria, England

See also 

 Zoo